The Battle of Khelna occurred between the Mughal Empire and Maratha Empire between 1701-1702. Mughal Emperor Aurangzeb ordered for the Fort of Khelna to be besieged. Mughal General Asad Khan launched an offensive and besieged the fortress. After about a three-month siege, Maratha commander, Parashurampant surrendered under the condition that he and his garrison would be allowed to march out unharmed.

References

Khelna 1702
Khelna
1702 in India
Khelna